The Israel Project (TIP) was a US-based 501(c)(3) non-profit, non-government organization. According to TIP, it was not affiliated with any government, and according to its website, it had a team with decades of experience in media, government, policy institutes, research, academia and the military. TIP had offices in the United States and Israel, and regularly hosted press briefings featuring Israeli spokespeople and analysts.

According to TIP, its extensive Arabic media program had 1.2 million Arabic-speaking subscribers on TIP Arabic's Facebook page "Israel Uncensored". Despite the success, a new TIP management team in 2014 decided to drop the Arabic program, which went independent as Al-Masdar. Al-Masdar subsequently closed in April, 2019.

History
The Israel Project was founded by Jennifer Laszlo Mizrahi, Margo Volftsun, and Sheryl Schwartz in 2003. Mizrahi served as its president until 2012, when Josh Block took over as CEO and President. Initially started to change US and European perceptions of Israel, it had worked in English, French, German, Spanish, Russian, Arabic, and Chinese to reach a global audience. However, from the end of 2012; TIP decided to shut down its 'Global Affairs' unit to focus more on social media outreach and perceptions in both the U.S. and Israel. As of late 2016, its board of advisors included 36 Democratic and Republican members of the United States House of Representatives and United States Senate. TIP operated offices in Washington, D.C. and Jerusalem.

TIP was the first Jewish or pro-Israel group to host Palestinian Prime Minister Salam Fayyad the United States.

In July 2019, Haaretz reported that TIP could soon cease to exist due to a funding crisis. A month later, its offices in both Jerusalem and Washington were closed down, with Vice President Lior Weintraub citing polarization among Zionists as the reason.

Activities

Press information
TIP conducted polling and public opinion research with US focus groups and advised Israeli experts and political leaders on the most effective factual ways to present their views to US audiences: "We share [our] information with all the political leaders across the political spectrum because they're the ones being interviewed on television" TIP also provided information to journalists by offering background material, press conferences, and one-on-one interviews with these experts and political figures, such as Shimon Peres. TIP has supplied information for thousands of news stories around the world, as part of their "pro-Israel media advocacy" efforts. TIP also bought commercial time to air pro-Israel advertising on CNN, MSNBC, Fox News and other cable networks.

According to the organization's website, "TIP informs, providing facts, access to experts and keen analysis. It offers real-time background information, images, maps, audio, video, graphics and direct access to newsmakers. TIP organizes press briefings and speaker tours, conference calls and educational trips, supports non-profit journalism, conducts public affairs research and adheres to the highest possible standards of accuracy and reliability." TIP also distributes a daily newsletter, the Daily TIP, which provides updates and insights on events in the region.

TIP's President and CEO, Josh Block, a former official in the Clinton Administration and spokesman for AIPAC, published an op-ed in 2016 critical of the "increasingly isolationist wing of the Democratic party", which he called "neo-progs".

The Tower 
In 2013, TIP launched The Tower Magazine and TheTower.org. The Tower Magazine is a long-form online magazine published monthly, while TheTower.org is a live-updated news site covering facts and analysis about events affecting Israel and the Middle East. David Hazony serves as editor-in-chief of the publications.

The Tower Tomorrow Fellowship 
Every year, The Israel Project offers the opportunity for college and graduate school students to participate in a media internship program. The fellows undergo intensive training, working with leading journalists and communications professionals to gain the out-of-classroom experience necessary to secure post-graduate career opportunities. Throughout the nine-week program, fellows participate in all aspects of The Israel Project, from writing articles for publication to conducting interviews and organizing press events.

Helicopter tours

Part of TIP's efforts in Jerusalem include providing helicopter flights for foreign journalists and leaders visiting the country, called 'Intellicopter' tours. Members of the media and leaders are given an opportunity to witness firsthand the strategic difficulties facing Israel as a result of its small size. The two-and–a-half hour tour is led by TIP's guides who offer an analysis of Israel's history and current security challenges. Journalists from over 300 media outlets have taken TIP's intellicopter tour, and a large portion of news footage about the country is taken from this aerial view.

2009 Global Language Dictionary
The Israel Project commissioned a study by Frank Luntz who ran polls and focus groups to determine the best language to use to promote Israeli settlements to the American public. The study was marked, "Not for distribution or publication" and was leaked to Newsweek online. It recommends being positive, framing the issue as being about peace not settlements. The document also lists arguments that don't work, in particular noting that religious, ownership and "scapegoat" arguments failed to sway listeners, that Arab housing is being demolished in East Jerusalem because it fails to meet the building code, the worst claim by this group in the guide is "Israel is so rich and so strong that they fail to see why it is necessary for armored tanks to shoot at unarmed kids" para (3) page 90. This study states that "public opinion is hostile to the settlements—even among supporters of Israel" so instead of dwelling on settlements one should always talk positively and focus on past peace achievement.

Criticisms
Critics such as J Street describe the advice as "If you get a question about settlements, change the subject. If pressed, say stopping settlements is 'a kind of ethnic cleansing'." J Street sent a mailing to their organization asking their members to send letters to TIP asking them to "remove pro-settlement fear-mongering talking points from The Israel Project's materials".

An op-ed by Matthew Duss, a National Security reporter of the ThinkProgress blog, in The Jewish Daily Forward said several groups, including the Israel Project, "seem to exist for no other reason than to spotlight the very worst aspects of Muslim societies."

2007 Iran Focus Group 
A participant in a 2007 focus group commissioned by TIP reported that she had been "called in for what seemed an unusual assignment: to help test-market language that could be used to sell military action against Iran to the American public". The final question in the study was reportedly "How would you feel if George Bush ... Hillary Clinton ... or Israel bombed Iran". TIP founder Mizrahi said that her group had commissioned the focus group and had "shared information" produced by the focus group with Freedom's Watch. She claimed that the focus group was designed to help TIP promote "our belief in pushing sanctions" against Iran. TIP repeatedly went on the record in support of sanctions and they were passed by the United Nations Security Council.

References

External links
 Organization website

Defunct political advocacy groups in the United States
Israel–United States relations
Zionism in the United States
Zionist organizations
Organizations established in 2002
501(c)(3) organizations
2002 establishments in the United States
Pro-Israel political advocacy groups in the United States
Organizations disestablished in 2019
2019 disestablishments in the United States